Hillsborough High School can refer to:

Hillsborough High School (Florida) in Tampa, Florida
Hillsborough High School (New Jersey) in Hillsborough, New Jersey